Mummadi is the 3rd ordinal number or regnal number given to Kings and Queens in Kannada. Similarly there is Immadi(2nd) Nalvadi(4th). Regnal numbers are used to distinguish among persons with the same name who held the same office.

The following is a short list of some well-known personalities carrying the last name of "Mummadi".
 Mummadi Krishnaraja Wodeyar - Krishnaraja Wodeyar III, Member of the Wodeyar dynasty which ruled Mysore, known for his service to the Mysore state.
 Immadi Pulikeshi- Pulakesi II The Chalukya Ruler.
 Nalvadi Krishnaraja Wodeyar- Krishna Raja Wadiyar IV, 24th ruler of the Wodeyar dynasty of Mysore.

Titles
Indian monarchs